The Collège communautaire du Nouveau-Brunswick Edmundston Campus is a higher education institution (CCNB) with a main campus in Edmundston and another in Grand Falls, New Brunswick. 

The college was founded in 1965 and welcomes over 2,000 students each year.

External links 

Edmundston Campus

Grand Falls, New Brunswick
Collège communautaire du Nouveau-Brunswick
Education in Edmundston